The 2013–14 Eastern Washington Eagles men's basketball team will represent Eastern Washington University during the 2013–14 NCAA Division I women's basketball season. The Eagles, are led by thirteenth year head coach Wendy Schuller and play their home games at Reese Court. They were members of the Big Sky Conference. They finish the season 16–14, 12–8 in Big Sky for a finish in fourth place. They lost in the quarterfinals of the 2014 Big Sky Conference women's basketball tournament to Idaho State.

Roster

Schedule
 

|-
!colspan=8 style="background:#a10022; color:#FFFFFF;"| Regular season

|-
!colspan=8 style="background:#FF0000; color:#FFFFFF;"| Regular season

|-
!colspan=9 style="background:#a10022; color:#FFFFFF;"| Big Sky Women's tournament

See also
2013–14 Eastern Washington Eagles men's basketball team

References

Eastern Washington Eagles women's basketball seasons
Eastern Washington
Eastern Washington Eagles
Eastern Washington Eagles